These Hands is a 1992 Tanzanian documentary produced and directed by Flora M'mbugu-Schelling.

Plot 
The film portrays the struggle of a Mozambican woman in a local mine, determined to make a difference despite all odds.

References 

Tanzanian documentary films
1992 documentary films
1992 films